Dorsal scapular may refer to:
 Dorsal scapular nerve
 Dorsal scapular artery
 Dorsal scapular vein